The Old World flycatchers are a large family, the Muscicapidae, of small passerine birds restricted to the Old World (Europe, Africa and Asia), with the exception of several vagrants and two species, bluethroat (Luscinia svecica) and northern wheatear (Oenanthe oenanthe), found also in North America. These are mainly small arboreal insectivores, many of which, as the name implies, take their prey on the wing. The family includes 352 species and is divided into 51 genera.

Taxonomy
The name Muscicapa for the family was introduced by the Scottish naturalist John Fleming in 1822. The word had earlier been used for the genus Muscicapa by the French zoologist Mathurin Jacques Brisson in 1760. Muscicapa comes from the Latin musca meaning a fly and capere to catch.

In 1910 the German ornithologist Ernst Hartert found it impossible to define boundaries between the three families Muscicapidae, Sylviidae (Old World warblers) and Turdidae (thrushes). He therefore treated them as subfamilies of an extended flycatcher family that also included Timaliidae (Old World babblers) and Monarchidae (Monarch flycatchers). Forty years later a similar arrangement was adopted by the American ornithologists Ernst Mayr and Dean Amadon in an article published in 1951. Their large family Muscicapidae which they termed the "primitive insect eaters" contained 1460 species divided into eight subfamilies. The use of the extended group was endorsed by a committee set up following the Eleventh International Ornithological Congress held in Basel in 1954. Subsequent DNA–DNA hybridization studies by Charles Sibley and others showed that the subfamilies were not closely related to one another. As a result, the large group was broken up into a number of separate families, although for a while most authorities continued to retain the thrushes in Muscicapidae. In 1998 the American Ornithologists' Union chose to treat the thrushes as a separate family in the seventh edition of their Check-list of North American birds and subsequently most authors have followed their example.

Description
The appearance of these birds is very varied, but they mostly have weak songs and harsh calls. They are small to medium birds, ranging from 9 to 22 cm in length. Many species are dull brown in colour, but the plumage of some can be much brighter, especially in the males.  Most have broad, flattened bills suited to catching insects in flight, although the few ground-foraging species typically have finer bills.

Old World flycatchers live in almost every environment with a suitable supply of trees, from dense forest to open scrub, and even the montane woodland of the Himalayas. The more northerly species migrate south in winter, ensuring a continuous diet of insects.

Depending on the species, their nests are either well-constructed cups placed in a tree or cliff ledge, or simply lining in a pre-existing tree hole. The hole-nesting species tend to lay larger clutches, with an average of eight eggs, rather than just two to five.

Genera
The family formerly included fewer species. At the time of the publication of the third edition of Howard and Moore Complete Checklist of the Birds of the World in 2003, the genera Myophonus, Alethe, Brachypteryx and Monticola were included in Turdidae. Subsequent molecular phylogenetic studies have shown that the species in these four genera are more closely related to species in Muscicapidae. As a consequence, these four genera are now placed here. In contrast, the genus Cochoa which was previously placed in Muscicapidae has been shown to belong in Turdidae.

Two large molecular phylogenetic studies of species within Muscicapidae published in 2010 showed that the genera Fraseria, Melaenornis and Muscicapa were non-monophyletic. The authors were unable to propose revised genera as not all the species were sampled and not all the nodes in their phylogenies were strongly supported. A subsequent study published in 2016, that included 37 of the 42 Muscicapini species, confirmed that the genera were non-monophyletic and proposed a reorganised arrangement of the species with several new or resurrected genera.

List of genera

Muscicapid genera as listed by the International Ornithologists' Union with subdivisions proposed by George Sangster and colleagues in 2010: For a complete list of species, see "List of Old World flycatcher species".

Family Muscicapidae
Alethe
Subfamily Muscicapinae (Fleming, 1822) 
Tribe Copsychini (Sundevall, 1872)
Cercotrichas – scrub robins
Copsychus – magpie-robins or shamas
Tribe Muscicapini (Fleming, 1822)
Fraseria – forest flycatchers
Myioparus – tit-flycatchers
Melaenornis
Empidornis – single species: silverbird
Muscicapa
Subfamily Niltavinae (Sangster, Alström, Forsmark and Olsson, 2010)
Leucoptilon – single species: white-tailed flycatcher
Anthipes
Cyornis 
Niltava
Cyanoptila
Eumyias
Sholicola
Subfamily  Erithacinae (G.R. Gray, 1846) – African forest robin assemblage
Erithacus – single species: European robin
Chamaetylas – (4 species)
Cossyphicula – single species: white-bellied robin-chat
Cossypha – robin-chats
Xenocopsychus – single species: Angola cave chat
Swynnertonia – single species: Swynnerton's robin
Pogonocichla – single species: white-starred robin
Stiphrornis – single species: forest robin
Sheppardia – akalats
Cichladusa – palm thrushes
Subfamily Saxicolinae (Vigors, 1825)
Heinrichia – single species: great shortwing
Leonardina – single species: Bagobo babbler
Heteroxenicus – single species: Gould's shortwing
Brachypteryx – shortwings
Vauriella
Larvivora – East and South-East Asian robins 
Luscinia – nightingales and relatives
Irania – single species: white-throated robin
Calliope
Myiomela
Tarsiger – bush robins and bluetails
Enicurus – forktails
Myophonus – whistling thrushes
Cinclidium – single species: blue-fronted robin
Ficedula – flycatchers
Phoenicurus – redstarts
Monticola – rock thrushes 
Saxicola – stonechats and chats 
Campicoloides – single species: buff-streaked chat
Emarginata
Pinarochroa – single species: moorland chat
Thamnolaea – cliff chats
Myrmecocichla
Oenanthe – wheatears
Subfamily not determined
Namibornis – single species: Herero chat 
Humblotia – single species: Humblot's flycatcher

Notes

References

Further reading

External links

Old World flycatcher videos on the Internet Bird Collection

Taxa named by John Fleming (naturalist)